Rustlers' Roundup is a 1933 American pre-Code Western film directed by Henry MacRae and written by Frank Howard Clark. The film stars Tom Mix, Noah Beery Jr., Douglass Dumbrille, Roy Stewart and Nelson McDowell. The film was released on March 16, 1933, by Universal Pictures.

Plot

Cast 
Tom Mix as Tom Lawson
Diane Sinclair as Mary Brand
Noah Beery Jr. as Danny Brand
Douglass Dumbrille as Bill Brett 
Roy Stewart as Dave Winters
Nelson McDowell as Sheriff Brass
William Desmond as San Dimas Sheriff Holden
Frank Lackteen as Henchman Bayhorse
William Wagner as Lawyer Homer Jones
Gilbert Holmes as Husky
Bud Osborne as Henchman Sodden

References

External links 
 

1933 films
1933 Western (genre) films
American Western (genre) films
American black-and-white films
Films directed by Henry MacRae
Universal Pictures films
1930s English-language films
1930s American films